Alessia Orla (born 5 April 1992 in Venaria Reale, Provincia di Torino) is an Italian professional triathlete, national youth champion of the year 2006 and junior champion of the year 2009.

In Italy, Alessia Orla represents the clubs AS Torino Triathlon and RUN Torino.

In 2011, Orla also takes part in the prestigious French Club Championship Series Lyonnaise des Eaux representing Brive Limousin.
At the opening triathlon in Nice (24 April 2011), Orla placed 23rd and proved to be among the three , none of whom was French (Lucy Hall, Emma Davis, Alessia Orla). At the Triathlon de Dunkerque (22 May 2011), Orla placed 24th and was the best of her club.

Brive Limousin does not mention Alessia Orla among its D1 elite triathletes. Triathlon Club Nantais, however, does enumerate her among its elite triathletes together with two Italian guest stars, Charlotte Bonin and Annamaria Mazzetti.

She is part of ECS Triathlon club.

ITU Competitions 
In 2009, Alessia Orla won the silver medal at the European Junior Team Championships in Tarzo Revine, in 2011 she won the gold medal at the Junior European Cup triathlon in Zwevegem.
Since 2011 Orla has attended elite ITU triathlons, placing 6th at the Winter Triathlon Cup in Valsesia.

The following list is based upon the official ITU rankings and the ITU Athletes's Profile Page.
Unless indicated otherwise, the following events are triathlons (Olympic Distance) and refer to the Elite category.

External links 
 Orla's Triathlon Club AS Torino in Italian

Notes 

Italian female triathletes
1992 births
Living people
Sportspeople from the Metropolitan City of Turin
Triathletes at the 2010 Summer Youth Olympics
European Games competitors for Italy
Triathletes at the 2015 European Games
21st-century Italian women